Sevier Ommy Crespo (born April 26, 1976) is an American film and television producer, actor, and writer.

Early life and career 
A native of Mayagüez, Puerto Rico, Crespo spent his formative years in Dallas, Texas. After studying at the KD Conservatory in Dallas, Crespo relocated to Los Angeles to pursue a career in acting. Following early bookings on television shows such as NYPD Blue, Crespo became interested in the production side of the entertainment business. His curiosity blossomed after a mentorship with Robert Townsend inspired Crespo to study Production and Line Production at UCLA. Films produced by Crespo have screened at Cannes and his work has included such actors as Lucy Hale, Taryn Manning, Danny Trejo, Steven Bauer, and Johnathan Schaech.

Selected filmography

References

External links 
 

American film producers
American television producers
American male film actors
American male television actors
1976 births
Living people